The Shirvan steppe is part of the Kur-Araz Lowland of Azerbaijan and is located on the left bank of the Kura River.

The steppe has grey desert soil. Its vegetation is halophytic and wormwood, with estuary meadows. The Upper Shirvan water channel was directed from the Mingachevir Reservoir in order to irrigate the land. Animal husbandry (in winter pastures) and horticulture (cotton, crops, and grape) are the main agriculture in the steppe.

See also
 Shirvan
 Shirvan (city)
 Shirvan National Park
 Shirvan State Reserve

References

Plains of Azerbaijan